Geraldine Brooks  (born 14 September 1955) is an Australian-American journalist and novelist whose 2005 novel March won the Pulitzer Prize for Fiction.

Early life 
A native of Sydney, Geraldine Brooks grew up in its inner-west suburb of Ashfield.  Her father, Lawrie Brooks, was an American big-band singer who was stranded in Adelaide on a tour of Australia when his manager absconded with the band's pay; he decided to remain in Australia, and became a newspaper sub-editor. Her mother Gloria, from Boorowa, was a public relations officer with radio station 2GB in Sydney. She attended Bethlehem College, a secondary school for girls, and the University of Sydney.  Following graduation, she was a rookie reporter for The Sydney Morning Herald and, after winning a Greg Shackleton Memorial Scholarship, moved to the United States, completing a master's degree at New York City's Columbia University Graduate School of Journalism in 1983. The following year, in the Southern France artisan village of Tourrettes-sur-Loup, she married American journalist Tony Horwitz and converted to Judaism.

Career 
As a foreign correspondent for The Wall Street Journal, she covered crises in Africa, the Balkans, and the Middle East. The stories from the Persian Gulf that she and her husband reported in 1990 received the Overseas Press Club's Hal Boyle Award for "Best Newspaper or Wire Service Reporting from Abroad". In 2006, she was awarded a fellowship at Harvard University's Radcliffe Institute for Advanced Study.

Brooks's first book, Nine Parts of Desire (1994), based on her experiences among Muslim women in the Middle East, was an international bestseller, translated into 17 languages. Foreign Correspondence (1997), which won the Nita Kibble Literary Award for women's writing, was a memoir and travel adventure about a childhood enriched by penpals from around the world, and her adult quest to find them.

Her first novel, Year of Wonders, published in 2001, became an international bestseller. Set in 1666, the story depicts a young woman's battle to save fellow villagers as well as her own soul when the bubonic plague suddenly strikes her small Derbyshire village of Eyam.

Her next novel, March (2005), was inspired by her fondness for Louisa May Alcott's Little Women, which her mother had given her. To connect that memorable reading experience to her new status in 2002 as an American citizen, she researched the Civil War historical setting of Little Women and decided to create a chronicle of wartime service for the "absent father" of the March girls. Some aspects of this chronicle were informed by the life and philosophical writings of the Alcott family patriarch, Amos Bronson Alcott, whom she profiled under the title "Orpheus at the Plough", in the 10 January 2005 issue of The New Yorker, a month before March was published. The parallel novel received a mixed reaction from critics, but was nonetheless selected in December 2005 by the Washington Post as one of the five best fiction works published that year, and in April 2006, it won the Pulitzer Prize for Fiction.  She was eligible for the prize by virtue of her American citizenship, and was the first Australian to win the prize.

In her next novel, People of the Book (2008), Brooks explored a fictionalized history of the Sarajevo Haggadah. This novel was inspired by her reporting (for The New Yorker) of human interest stories emerging in the aftermath of the 1991–95 breakup of Yugoslavia. The novel won both the Australian Book of the Year Award and the Australian Literary Fiction Award in 2008.

Her 2011 novel Caleb's Crossing is inspired by the life of Caleb Cheeshahteaumauk, a Wampanoag convert to Christianity who was the first Native American to graduate from Harvard College, in the seventeenth century.

Brooks, at the invitation of the Australian Broadcasting Corporation, delivered the 2011 series of the prestigious Boyer Lectures. These have been published as "The Idea of Home", and reveal her passionate humanist values.

The Secret Chord (2015) is a historical novel based on the life of the biblical King David in the Second Iron Age.

In 2016, Brooks visited Israel, as part of a project by the "Breaking the Silence" organization, to write an article for a book on the Israeli occupation, to mark the 50th anniversary of the Six-Day War. The book was edited by Michael Chabon and Ayelet Waldman, and was published under the title "Kingdom of Olives and Ash: Writers Confront the Occupation", in June 2017.

Horse (2022) is a historical novel based upon the racing horse Lexington. It quickly became a New York Times Best Seller.

Recognition 
2006: Pulitzer Prize for March
2008: Australian Publishers Association's Literary Fiction Book of the Year for People of the Book
2009: Peggy V. Helmerich Distinguished Author Award
2010: Dayton Literary Peace Prize Lifetime Achievement Award
2016: Officer of the Order of Australia in the Australia Day Honours

Works

Novels

Nonfiction

Personal life
While retaining her Australian citizenship, Brooks became a United States citizen in 2002.

She has two sons with her husband Tony Horwitz, Nathaniel and Bizu. Tony died suddenly in 2019 while away on a book tour.

References

Further reading 
 Review of Caleb's crossing.

External links
Geraldine Brooks official website
Geraldine Brooks interviewed by Ramona Koval on ABC Radio National's The Book Show, regarding her novel, People of the Book
"A Muslim Response to 'Nine Parts of Desire'", Resources for and about Muslim Women, Jannah.org
Geraldine Brooks' Civil War March, NPR
2008 Interview: Geraldine Brooks, Littoral, blog -Key West Literary Seminar

Australian emigrants to the United States
American women journalists
American women novelists
People from Waterford, Virginia
Pulitzer Prize for Fiction winners
Columbia University Graduate School of Journalism alumni
Radcliffe fellows
Converts to Judaism
Jewish Australian writers
Jewish American writers
1955 births
Living people
21st-century American novelists
Writers from Sydney
21st-century American memoirists
American women memoirists
21st-century American women writers
Officers of the Order of Australia
Australian women novelists
Australian people of American descent
The Wall Street Journal people
Women war correspondents
The Sydney Morning Herald people
21st-century American Jews